Paul Diethei (26 June 1925 – 25 September 1997) was a German politician from the Christian Social Union of Bavaria. He was a member of the Landtag of Bavaria from 1966 to 1994.

References

1925 births
1997 deaths
People from Donau-Ries
Members of the Landtag of Bavaria
Christian Social Union in Bavaria politicians
Officers Crosses of the Order of Merit of the Federal Republic of Germany